Wapahani High School is a high school located near Selma, Indiana. The school is the only high school for the community, which is served by Liberty-Perry Community Schools.

History 
Wapahani High School was founded in 1967 to replace Selma and Center High Schools. Wapahani is a Delaware Indian word for White River, whose west fork runs a few hundred yards behind the school.

Demographics
The demographic breakdown of the 356 students enrolled for the 2012-2013 school year was:
Male - 47.2%
Female - 52.8%
Hispanic - 1.1%
White - 96.6%
Multiracial - 2.3%

In addition, 39.3% of the students were eligible for free or reduced lunches.

Athletics 
The Raiders are members of the Mid-Eastern Conference.  The following IHSAA sanctioned sports are offered at Wapahani:

Baseball (boys)
State champion - 2014
Basketball (girls & boys)
Cross country (girls & boys)
Golf (girls & boys)
Soccer (girls & boys)
Softball (girls)
Track (girls & boys)
Volleyball (girls)
State champion - 2002, 2011, 2012, 2015, 2016, 2022
Wrestling (boys)

See also
 List of high schools in Indiana

References

External links
School website
School district website

Public high schools in Indiana
Educational institutions established in 1967
Schools in Delaware County, Indiana
1967 establishments in Indiana